An ambry (or almery, aumbry; from the medieval form almarium, cf. Lat. armārium, "a place for keeping tools"; cf. O. Fr. aumoire and mod. armoire) is a recessed cabinet in the wall of a Christian church for storing sacred vessels and vestments. They are sometimes near the piscina, but more often on the opposite side. The word also seems in medieval times to have been commonly used for any closed cupboard or even a bookcase.

Items kept in an ambry include chalices and other vessels, as well as items for the reserved sacrament, the consecrated elements from the Eucharist. This latter use was infrequent in pre-Reformation churches, although it was known in Scotland, Sweden, Germany and Italy. More usually the sacrament was reserved in a pyx, usually hanging in front of and above the altar or later in a "sacrament house".

After the Reformation and the Tridentine reforms, in the Roman Catholic Church the sacrament was no longer reserved in ambries; some ambries were used to house the oil for the Anointing of the Sick. Today in the Roman Catholic Church, the consecrated elements may only be reserved in a tabernacle or hanging pyx; reservation in an ambry is now forbidden.

The Reformed churches abandoned reservation of the elements, so that ambries, unless used for housing vessels, became redundant. But, in the Scottish Episcopal church since the eighteenth century and other Anglican churches since the nineteenth century (following the Tractarian revival), reservation has again become common. In the Church of England the sacrament is reserved in all forty-four cathedrals, as well as many parish churches, although it is very uncommon amongst churches of an evangelical tradition. Reservation of the sacrament is quite common in the Episcopal Church of the United States, the Anglican Church of Australia, the Anglican Church in Aotearoa, New Zealand and Polynesia, the Anglican Church of Southern Africa, as well as in the Anglican Church of Canada (though with varying degrees of veneration, depending on the parish). Even some traditionally Low Church parishes, such as St. Anne's, Toronto, reserve the sacrament.

Roman Catholic usage

In Roman Catholic usage, when commonly called an ambry, it is traditionally in the sanctuary (as in, the altar area) of a church or in the Baptistery, and is used to store the oils used in sacraments: Oil of catechumens (indicated by the Latin letters O.C.), Oil of the Sick (O.I.), and Sacred Chrism (S.C.). Former regulations required it to be secured and locked, and lined and veiled with either purple cloth (in reference to the Oil of the Sick) or white (for the Sacred Chrism). The door was usually marked "O.S." or Olea Sancta, to indicate the contents. Such regulations are now relaxed so that while many churches continue to use such an ambry, the oils are also stored and in some cases displayed in other ways.

Anglican Churches
According to Ritual Notes, the Anglo-Catholic manual of rites and ceremonies, aumbries are used for reservation rather than tabernacles in churches in some dioceses because the diocesan bishop has so ordered. These aumbries should conform in general to the requirements for tabernacles including an ever-burning light and covering with a veil. For storage of the holy oil of the sick a lesser aumbry is to be used; it should be lined with purple silk, covered with a purple veil and kept locked; the door should be inscribed "oleum sacrum". (If the priest lives far away from the church he or she may be authorised to keep the holy oil of the sick at home.)

See also

 Glossary of the Catholic Church
 Index of Catholic Church articles

References

Sources

Further reading
Dijk, S. J. P. van & Walker, Joan H. (1957) The Myth of the Aumbry (a critique of G. Dix)
Dix, Gregory (1942) A Detection of Aumbries
Maffei, Edmond (1942) La réservation eucharistique jusqu'à la Renaissance. Brussels: Vromant

External links

 Aumbry

Church architecture